Adams Central Community Schools is a public school system located in Monroe, Indiana and serves the surrounding area. The elementary, middle, and high schools of Adams Central share the same building as one.

Sports:

Their Football, Wrestling, and Softball programs have been very successful in recent years.

Their sports include:

Volleyball (Girls), 
Football (Boys), 
Tennis, 
Cross Country, 
Swimming, 
Basketball, 
Wrestling, 
Baseball (Boys), 
Softball (Girls), 
Golf, 
Track and Field, 
Bowling.

See also
Adams Central High School

External links
Official website

Education in Adams County, Indiana
School districts in Indiana